Atchampet mandal (officially Atchampet H/O Chamarru) is one of the 28 mandals in Palnadu district of the Indian state of Andhra Pradesh. The mandal is under the administration of Sattenapalli revenue division and the headquarters are located at Chamarru. The mandal is located on the banks of Krishna River, at a distance 68 km from the district headquarters. It is bounded by Amaravathi, Krosuru, Pedakurapadu, Bellamkonda and Sattenapalli mandals.

Demographics 

 census, the mandal had a population of 58,447. The total population constitute, 29,749 males and 28,698 females —a sex ratio of 965 females per 1000 males. 6,676 children are in the age group of 0–6 years.

Government and politics 

The mandal is under the control of a tahsildar and the present tahsildar is G.Sujatha. Atchampet mandal is one of the 5 mandals under Pedakurapadu (Assembly constituency), which in turn represents Narasaraopet (Lok Sabha constituency) of Andhra Pradesh.

Jurisdiction 

 census, the mandal has 18 villages.

The settlements in the mandal are listed below:

See also 

 List of mandals in Andhra Pradesh
 Villages in Atchampet mandal

References

External links

Mandals in Guntur district